International Conference on Remote Engineering and Virtual Instrumentation (REV) is an annual IAOE conference.

REV is an annual conference covering topics on online & remote engineering, virtual instrumentation and applications. Like other conferences, REV offers various tracks and simultaneous sessions, tutorials and workshops.

The first REV was held in Villach, Austria in 2004. It operates under the auspices of the International Association of Online Engineering (IAOE).

REV’s venue changes every year, and the categories of its program vary. Historically REV has combined the presentation of academic papers with comparatively practical experience reports, panels, workshops and tutorials.

Locations and organizers

External links
Official website

Computer science conferences